This is a list of London medical students who assisted at Bergen-Belsen concentration camp after its liberation at the end of the Second World War. There were 96 in total. Most of the students were in their penultimate year of medical education and were recruited from nine medical schools in London.

They were a feature of a BBC Open Space programme in 1984.

Guy's Hospital

King's College Hospital

Middlesex Hospital 
Colonel E.E. Vella reported that there were eight students from Middlesex Hospital:

St Bartholomew's Hospital 
In 1981, in parliament, Eldon Griffiths calculated that nine students volunteered from St Bartholomew's Hospital.

St Mary's Hospital 

Students from St Mary's Hospital Medical School included:

St Thomas' Hospital 
Twelve students went from St Thomas' Medical School. included:

The London Hospital 
One account states there were twelve students from the London Hospital.

University College London 
Those from UCL Medical School included:

Westminster Hospital 

Westminster Hospital Medical School's tercentenary booklet states that they sent   eleven students,

See also
 Charles Enrique Dent
 Janet Vaughan
 Rosalind Pitt-Rivers

References

External links
Online archive

London
London medical students who assisted at Belsen
Medicine in Nazi Germany